Curtis R. Priem is an American computer scientist.

He received a B.S. degree in electrical engineering from Rensselaer Polytechnic Institute in 1982. He designed the first graphics processor for the PC, the IBM Professional Graphics Adapter.

From 1986 to 1993, he was a senior staff engineer at Sun Microsystems, where he developed the GX graphics chip.

He cofounded NVIDIA with Jen-Hsun Huang and Chris Malachowsky and was its Chief Technical Officer from 1993 to 2003. He retired from NVIDIA in 2003.

In 2000, RPI named him Entrepreneur of the Year. From 2003 to 2007 he was a trustee of Rensselaer. In 2004 he announced that he would donate an unrestricted gift of $40 million to the Institute. Rensselaer subsequently created the Curtis R. Priem Experimental Media and Performing Arts Center, named in his honor and usually referred to as "EMPAC" for short.

He is also president of the Priem Family Foundation, which he established with his wife Veronica in September, 1999. The foundation is non-operating (i.e., has no office or staff, and therefore, no overhead) and exists only to give money to other foundations or charities.

References

Nvidia people
Rensselaer Polytechnic Institute alumni
Year of birth missing (living people)
Living people
American technology company founders
American electrical engineers
American chief technology officers
American philanthropists